Åfarnes (historically, Aafarnes) is a village in Rauma Municipality in Møre og Romsdal county, Norway. The village is located at the confluence of the three fjords: Romsdal Fjord, Langfjorden, and Rødvenfjorden. The Norwegian County Road 64 runs through the village on its way from the town of Åndalsnes (to the south) and the town of Molde (to the north). There is a ferry quay in Åfarnes with regular ferries across the Langfjorden to the village of Sølsnes in Molde Municipality to the north. The proposed Langfjord Tunnel would connect Åfarnes and Sølsnes as part of County Road 64.

References

Villages in Møre og Romsdal
Rauma, Norway